The Office of Allegheny County Medical Examiner investigates cases of persons who die within Allegheny County, Pennsylvania from criminal violence by casualty or by suicide, when unattended by a physician; under correctional custody or any other suspicious or unusual manner.  The office's jurisdiction includes the city of Pittsburgh and its immediate suburbs.

Prior to 2005 the Coroner was an elected position within the county, however on December 29, 2005 the position was abolished and retitled "Medical Examiner" with all future office holders being appointees of the Allegheny County Executive once approved by county council.  Longtime coroner Cyril Wecht continued to serve as both the last coroner and first medical examiner.

The Medical Examiner's Office also houses the Forensic Laboratory Division for the county.  The disciplines within the laboratory are Drug Chemistry, Environmental Health, Firearms/Toolmarks, Forensic Biology, Latent Prints, Mobile Crime Unit, Toxicology, and Trace Evidence.

The office made headlines in the 1930s in its investigations into some of the Mad Butcher Killings.  In the 1950s the office (headed by William McClelland) was a leader in attempting to raise the driving age from 16 to 18.  The 1970s had the office gaining national prominence as Dr. Cyril Wecht led several investigations into the John F. Kennedy assassination.

History
The office, then known as the Corner's office, was located at #6 Eighth Street in 1901.

The office has been headed by several notable coroners/medical examiners including:
December 22, 2006 – present Karl Williams 
January 20, 2006 - December 22, 2006 Abdulrezak Shakir
January 1, 1996 - January 20, 2006 Cyril Wecht
July 1, 1994 – January 1, 1996 F. James Gregis
January 4, 1982 – July 1, 1994 Joshua Perper
March 2, 1981 – January 4, 1982 Sanford Edberg
January 9, 1980 – March 2, 1981 Joshua Perper
January 2, 1970 - January 8, 1980 Cyril Wecht
1968-January 2, 1970 Ralph Stalter
1966-1968 William R. Hunt 
1960-1966 Joseph B. Dobbs
1942-1960 William D. McClelland (candidate for governor in 1954) 
1921-193? William J. McGregor 
1904-1909? Joseph G. Armstrong
Jan 1900 -1903 Jesse M. McGeary  
1887-1899, Aug 1892  Heber McDowell 
Pre-1881 William McCallin

Further reading
Youngstown Vindicator article on the office dealing with a drug epidemic

References

Government of Allegheny County, Pennsylvania
Forensics organizations
Government agencies established in 2005
2005 establishments in Pennsylvania
Medical examiners